The 1981 Penn Quakers football team represented the University of Pennsylvania in the 1981 NCAA Division I-A football season.

Schedule

References

Penn
Penn Quakers football seasons
Penn Quakers football